Supercritical may refer to:

Physics and technology

Condensed matter physics
 Critical temperature, TC, a temperature above which distinct liquid and gas phases do not exist for a given material
 Supercritical drying, a process used to remove liquid in a precisely controlled way, similar to freeze drying
 Supercritical fluid, a substance at a temperature and pressure above its thermodynamic critical point:
 Supercritical carbon dioxide:
 Supercritical fluid chromatography, a form of liquid chromatography using supercritical carbon dioxide as the mobile phase
Supercritical water:
 Supercritical steam generator, a steam generator operating above the critical point of water, hence having no water–steam separation
 Supercritical water oxidation or SCWO, a process that occurs in water at temperatures and pressures above a mixture's thermodynamic critical point
 Supercritical water reactor (SCWR), a Generation IV nuclear reactor concept that uses supercritical water as the working fluid

Flows
 Supercritical flow, where flow velocity is larger than wave velocity
 Supercritical airfoil, an airfoil designed to delay the onset of wave drag in the transonic speed regime

Nuclear physics
 Supercritical mass, an amount of fissile material that will undergo a sustained nuclear chain reaction at an increasing rate

Mathematics
 Hopf bifurcation, in mathematics, a local bifurcation; when the first Lyapunov coefficient is negative,  the bifurcation is called supercritical
 Pitchfork bifurcation, in mathematics, similar to Hopf bifurcation

Other uses
 Super Critical, an album by British pop/rock group The Ting Tings